Meroplius is a genus of flies in the family Sepsidae.

Species
Meroplius albuquerquei Silva, 1990
Meroplius beckeri (Meijere, 1906)
Meroplius bispinifer Ozerov, 1999
Meroplius burundi Ozerov, 2018
Meroplius cordylophorus Hennig, 1954
Meroplius curvispinifer Ozerov, 2004
Meroplius elephantis Iwasa, 1994
Meroplius fasciculatus (Brunetti, 1909)
Meroplius flavofemoratus Ozerov, 2000
Meroplius hastifer Séguy, 1938
Meroplius hastiferoides Ozerov, 1999
Meroplius kirkspriggsi Ozerov, 2000
Meroplius latispinifer Ozerov, 1999
Meroplius madagascarensis Iwasa, 1996
Meroplius maximus Iwasa, 1994
Meroplius minutus (Wiedemann, 1830)
Meroplius mirandus Iwasa, 1994
Meroplius sauteri (Meijere, 1913)
Meroplius trispinifer Ozerov, 1999
Meroplius unispinifer Ozerov, 1999
Meroplius vittata Ozerov, 1985
Meroplius wallacei Iwasa, 1999
Meroplius zimbabweensis Ozerov, 2018

References

Sepsidae
Diptera of Africa
Diptera of Asia
Diptera of North America
Diptera of South America
Taxa named by Camillo Rondani
Brachycera genera